Rajesh Udesingh Padvi is an Indian politician. He was elected to the Maharashtra Legislative Assembly from Shahada in the 2019 Maharashtra Legislative Assembly election as a member of Bharatiya Janata Party.

References 

1969 births
Living people
Bharatiya Janata Party politicians from Maharashtra
People from Nandurbar district
Maharashtra MLAs 2019–2024